Hill Hotel may refer to:

Hill Hotel (Omaha, Nebraska)
Hill Hotel (Portland, Oregon)

See also
Taylor Hill Hotel, Coal Hill, Arkansas, listed on the NRHP in Johnson County, Arkansas